Ponnana Neram is a 2001 Indian Tamil-language drama film directed by the duo Ravi-Raja. The film stars Ramarajan and Prathyusha, while Shanmugasundaram and Sukumar appear in supporting roles. Featuring music composed by Pradeep Ravi, the film was released on 14 November 2001.

Plot 
Ramarajan portrays a police officer and Prathyusha stars as a college student, who is a prankster who often gets others into trouble. Prathyusha witnesses few terrorists planning to kill a minister — but nobody is ready to believe her. Whether Ramarajan stops the terrorist attack forms the crux of the story.

Cast 
Ramarajan as Manivel
Prathyusha as Pooja
Alex
Shanmugasundaram
Ganthimathi
Mansoor Ali Khan
Sukumar

Soundtrack 
The soundtrack was composed by Pradeep Ravi.
"Naan Ready"
"Hello Hai Mamo"
"Kolusu Kolusu"
"Thimu Thimu Roja" by Anuradha Sriram

References 

2001 films
2000s Tamil-language films
Indian action drama films
Fictional portrayals of the Tamil Nadu Police
2001 action drama films